Vejlby Church (Danish: Vejlby Kirke) is a church located in Vejlby Parish in Aarhus, Denmark. It is a parish church belonging to the Church of Denmark. The parish has a population of 7,148 (2015).

History 
Vejlby Church in medieval times belonged to the canon administration under Aarhus Cathedral. Following the reformation, the church was confiscated by the state and on 29 April 1720 it was given to a merchant from Aarhus. The merchant died in 1741 but the church stayed in the family until 1770 when it was sold to the Aarhus County administrator. It was transferred many times in the following years until Anders Rasmussen in Brendstrup and Christian Faurschou bought it in 1784. In 1810 the parish tithe was sold to the landowners within the parish. The church became an independent institution within the Church of Denmark in 1911.

Vejlby Church originally did not have its own priest. The canon administration in Aarhus Cathedral appointed officials to serve as priests up to 1680 when the last canon died. The church was subsequently annexed to the chaplain in the cathedral where it stayed until the early 19th century. In 1803 it was decided that Vejlby parish should become a separate pastorate upon the next vacancy which occurred in 1811 and the parish has since had its own priest. The church cemetery is associated to a myth similar to the Bible story of Jephthah. Allegedly the builder of the cemetery promised to bury the first living being he met after construction had been completed; it happened to be his son.

Architecture 
The nave and choir are in Romanesque style constructed of boulders with ashlar around the corners, windows and doors. In the late medieval period the church was renovated. A Gothic tower and porch, and vaults in the nave, were added. According to an inscription it was Bishop Niels Clausen (bishop 1490-1520) who in 1492 was responsible for the renovation. The church is decorated with frescos from the same period.

See also 
 List of Churches in Aarhus

References

External links
Vejlby Church Website
Church of Denmark's page for Vejlby Parish

Lutheran churches in Aarhus
Church frescos in Denmark
12th-century churches in Denmark
Lutheran churches converted from Roman Catholicism
Churches in the Diocese of Aarhus